Cullin 1, also known as CUL1, is a human protein and gene from cullin family.
This protein plays an important role in protein degradation and protein ubiquitination.

This is an essential component of the SCF (SKP1-CUL1-F-box protein) E3 ubiquitin ligase complex, which mediates the ubiquitination of proteins involved in cell cycle progression, signal transduction and transcription. In the SCF complex, it serves as a rigid scaffold that organizes the SKP1-F-box protein and RBX1 subunits. May contribute to catalysis through positioning of the substrate and the ubiquitin-conjugating enzyme.

This protein is a part of a SCF complex consisting of CUL1, RBX1, SKP1 and SKP2. It also interacts with RNF7. Part of a complex with TIP120A/CAND1 and RBX1. The unneddylated form interacts with TIP120A/CAND1 and the interaction negatively regulates the association with SKP1 in the SCF complex. Interacts with COPS2.
    
It is expressed in lung fibroblasts.

The protein is neddylated, which enhances the ubiquitination activity of SCF. Deneddylated via its interaction with the COP9 signalosome (CSN) complex.

Further reading

External links